The blackspot tuskfish (Choerodon schoenleinii) is a wrasse native to the Indian Ocean and the western Pacific Ocean from Mauritius to Indonesia and Australia north to the Ryukyus. This species occurs on reefs, preferring areas with sandy substrates or areas of weed growth. It is important to local commercial fisheries and is also farmed. It is popular as a game fish, in particular with spearfishers, and can be found in the aquarium trade.

In Hong Kong, its Cantonese name, tsing yi (Cantonese:青衣), has been given to an island (see Tsing Yi).

Etymology
The fish is named in honor of Johann Lucas Schönlein (1793-1864), the German naturalist and professor of medicine.

Documentation of tool use
In July 2011, a professional diver photographed a blackspot tuskfish bashing a clam on a rock to break the shell, apparently a use of the rock as a tool, the first documented example of tool use in wild fish.

References

External links
 

blackspot tuskfish
Fauna of Hong Kong
Fish of Indonesia
Fish of Taiwan
Marine fish of Northern Australia
Near threatened animals
blackspot tuskfish